In mathematical analysis, the Minkowski inequality establishes that the Lp spaces are normed vector spaces.

if  or in the case  by the essential supremum

The Minkowski inequality is the triangle inequality in  In fact, it is a special case of the more general fact

where it is easy to see that the right-hand side satisfies the triangular inequality.

Like Hölder's inequality, the Minkowski inequality can be specialized to sequences and vectors by using the counting measure:

The inequality is named after the German mathematician Hermann Minkowski.

Proof

First, we prove that  has finite -norm if  and  both do, which follows by

This means that

Now, we can legitimately talk about  If it is zero, then Minkowski's inequality holds. We now assume that  is not zero. Using the triangle inequality and then Hölder's inequality, we find that

We obtain Minkowski's inequality by multiplying both sides by

Minkowski's integral inequality

with obvious modifications in the case   If  and both sides are finite, then equality holds only if  a.e. for some non-negative measurable functions  and 

If  is the counting measure on a two-point set  then Minkowski's integral inequality gives the usual Minkowski inequality as a special case: for putting  for  the integral inequality gives

If the measurable function  is non-negative then for all 

This notation has been generalized to

Reverse inequality

When  the reverse inequality holds:

The reverse inequality follows from the same argument as the standard Minkowski, but uses that Holder's inequality is also reversed in this range.

Using the Reverse Minkowski, we may prove that power means with  such as the Harmonic Mean and the Geometric Mean are concave.

Generalizations to other functions

The Minkowski inequality can be generalized to other functions  beyond the power function
 The generalized inequality has the form 

Various sufficient conditions on  have been found by Mulholland and others. For example, for  one set of sufficient conditions from Mulholland is 
  is continuous and strictly increasing with 
  is a convex function of 
  is a convex function of

See also

References

  
 
 .
 .

Further reading

 

Articles containing proofs
Inequalities
Measure theory
Lp spaces